This list includes notable clinical psychologists and contributors to clinical psychology, some of whom may not have thought of themselves primarily as clinical psychologists but are included here because of their important contributions to the discipline.



A 
 Lauren Alloy
 Alfred W. Adler (inferiority complex)

B 
 Richard Bandler, co-founder of neuro-linguistic programming (NLP)
 Albert Bandura, behavior theorist
 David H. Barlow, known for his study and treatment of anxiety and related disorders
 Deirdre Barrett, researcher on dreams and hypnosis
 Aaron T. Beck, founder of cognitive therapy
 Kim Bergman, surrogacy psychologist
 Eric Berne
 Larry E. Beutler, systematic treatment selection
 Wilfred Bion
 Theodore H. Blau
 Nathaniel Branden, notable as a clinician for sentence stems technique, style of group therapy, clinical approaches to self-esteem work
 David D. Burns, cognitive-behavioral therapy/theory

C 
 James Cantor
 Robert Cialdini
 Stephen Connor, psychologist

D 
 Lisa Damour
 Daniel O David
 Arthur A. Dole

E 
 Steve Eichel
 Albert Ellis, founder of rational-emotive therapy (RET)
 Erik Erikson
 Hans Eysenck

F 
 Ronald Fairbairn theorist of object-relations psychoanalysis
 Edna B Foa
 Anna Freud
 Sigmund Freud, Austrian neurologist and the founder of psychoanalysis

G 
 Hans-Werner Gessmann, founder of humanistic psychodrama
 Paul Gilbert (psychologist), founder of compassion focused therapy (CFT)
 Kurt Goldstein, theorist of holistic psychology and self-actualization

H 
 Steven C. Hayes
 Stefan Hofmann
 Olivia Hooker
 Karen Horney, founder of feminist psychology and major theorist of conflict-based neuroses.
 Clark Hull

J 
 Kay Redfield Jamison
 Arthur Janov, invented primal therapy
 Mary Cover Jones
 Carl G. Jung, founder of analytical psychology

K 
 Alan E. Kazdin, developer of parent management training
 Melanie Klein

L 
 Michael Langone 
 Robert Langs
 Jan van der Lans
 Arnold A. Lazarus, early writer in CBT 
 Richard Lazarus
 Harriet Lerner
 Marsha Linehan, founder of dialectical behavior therapy

M 
 Ali ibn Abbas al-Majusi (Haly Abbas)
 Isaac Marks
 Paul R. Martin
 Abraham Maslow
 Rollo May
 Rufus May
 Paul Meehl
 Cindy Meston
 Jesse S. Miller 
 Neal Miller
 Theodore Millon, known for his work on personality disorders

O 
 Joy Osofsky

P 
 Jordan Peterson
 Robert O. Pihl
 Rebecca Pillai Riddell

Q 
 Heinz Kohut, theorist of self psychology

R 
 Carl Rogers
 Richard Rogers
 Stephen Rollnick, with William R. Miller co-founder of motivational interviewing
 Marshall Rosenberg

S 
 Edgar Schein
 Kirk J. Schneider
 Martin Seligman
 Tamara Sher
 Hunter B. Shirley
 Margaret Singer
 B.F. Skinner
 Victor Skumin
 C. Michael Smith
 Daniel N. Stern
 , Clinical Psychologist at Disha Counseling Center
 Harry Stack Sullivan, founder of interpersonal psychoanalysis

T 
 Maurice K. Temerlin
 Edward Thorndike, behavior theorist

V 
 Douglas Vakoch

W 
 John B. Watson
 D. W. Winnicott, object-relations psychoanalyst
 Joseph Wolpe
Bobby E. Wright

Z 
 Philip Zimbardo

See also
 List of psychologists
 List of people by occupation

Psychologists, Clinical
Clinical Psychologists